Flight 11P of SpaceShipOne was its eighth independent flight, its first powered flight, and the first privately funded crewed flight to reach supersonic speeds. It occurred on December 17, 2003.

The date of the test flight was 100 years to the day since the Wright Brothers made the first powered flight. It followed several months of glide tests. The pilot was Brian Binnie.

Details
White Knight, piloted by Peter Siebold, carried SpaceShipOne to launch altitude. At 08:15 PDT at an altitude of 47,900 feet (14.6 km) and a speed of 112 knots (58 m/s), SpaceShipOne was released from White Knight. After gliding to 44,400 feet (13.5 km) and accelerating to Mach 0.55, the rocket was lit for a 15 second burn.

9 seconds into the burn, SpaceShipOne exceeded the speed of sound. The craft climbed at a 70 degree angle, accelerating at 3 g (30 m/s²). At burn-out the Mach number was 1.2. The craft coasted to an apogee altitude of 67,800 feet (20.7 km).

The craft was reconfigured into high-drag ("feathered") mode to begin descent. After about a minute of descent, it switched to glider configuration at 35,000 feet (10.7 km). It then glided for 12 minutes back to Mojave Airport.

During landing a roll oscillation caused the left main gear to collapse. The craft made a runway excursion rolling to a stop in soft sand. The craft sustained minor damage, later repaired, and the pilot was uninjured.

References

External links
Scaled Composites' public flight log
X Prize page about Scaled Composites
SpaceShipOne breaks the sound barrier — press release from Scaled Composites

SpaceShipOne
Scaled Composites Tier One program
2003 in spaceflight